Vladislav Ivanov (born 7 May 1990) is a football player from Moldova. He was also a member of Moldova national football team since 2013.

Career
In 2016 he played for Sheriff Tiraspol.

References

External links
 
 
 Profile at moldova.sports.md
 

1990 births
Living people
Moldovan footballers
Association football midfielders
Moldova international footballers
Moldovan expatriate footballers
Expatriate footballers in Belarus
Moldovan Super Liga players
FC Sheriff Tiraspol players
FC Academia Chișinău players
FC Sfîntul Gheorghe players
FC Costuleni players
FC Veris Chișinău players
FC Dinamo-Auto Tiraspol players
FC Krumkachy Minsk players
CS Petrocub Hîncești players